Ghidini is an Italian surname. Notable people with the surname include:

Ferruccio Ghidini (1912–1994), Italian footballer
Gérard Ghidini (1943–2012), French slalom canoeist
Gianni Ghidini (1930–1995), Italian cyclist

See also
Ghedini

Italian-language surnames